Mitopus is a genus of the harvestman family Phalangiidae with nine described species.

Species
 Mitopus mobilis Karsch, 1881 (Japan)
 Mitopus dorsalis Banks, 1900 (Alaska)
 Mitopus ericaeus Jennings, 1982 (England)
 Mitopus glacialis (Heer, 1845)
 Mitopus koreanus (Roewer, 1957)
 Mitopus mongolicus Roewer, 1912 (Mongolia)
 Mitopus morio (Fabricius, 1779)
 Mitopus obliquus (C. L. Koch, 1839) (Alps, Greece)
 Mitopus projectus (Goodnight & Goodnight, 1942) (Oregon)

Harvestmen